Perseverance is the second studio album by American metalcore band Hatebreed. It was released in 2002 by Universal Records. "I Will Be Heard" is featured in the film XXX and on its soundtrack. "Below the Bottom" appeared in The Texas Chainsaw Massacre soundtrack. It is the band's last album to feature Lou Richards on guitar before his departure in 2002 and suicide in 2006.

Track listing

Credits 
Writing, performance and production credits are adapted from the album liner notes.

Personnel

Hatebreed 
 Jamey Jasta – vocals
 Lou "Boulder" Richards – rhythm guitar
 Sean Martin – lead guitar
 Chris "The Xmas Bitch" Beattie – bass
 Matt Byrne – drums

Guest musicians 
 Kerry King – guitar on "Final Prayer"

Additional musicians 
 Joseph Ianucci – gang vocals
 Jason Gelabert – gang vocals
 Joseph Herrington – gang vocals
 Christopher Harris – gang vocals
 Paul Romanko (Shadows Fall) – gang vocals
 Kyle Tanguay – gang vocals
 Brian Murphy – gang vocals
 Jim Connolly – gang vocals
 Jonathan Donais (Shadows Fall) – gang vocals
 Chris Bailey – gang vocals
 Ivan Murillo – gang vocals

Production 
 Steve Richards – executive production
 Matt Hyde – production, recording
 Jay Gelabert – production assistant
 Josh Grden – production coordination
 Zeuss – recording
 Paul Forgues – recording assistant, digital editing
 Phil Caivano – recording assistant, guitar tech
 Rob Gil – engineering assistant
 Randy Staub – mixing
 German Villacorta – engineering assistant
 Dave Collins – mastering

Artwork and design 
 Dean Karr – art direction, photography
 Steven R. Gilmore – design, photo editing

Studios 
 Long View Farm Studios, North Brookfield, MA – recording
 Henson Recording Studios, Los Angeles, CA – mixing
 Marcussen Mastering, Los Angeles, CA – mastering

Charts

Year-end charts

References

External links 
 

2002 albums
Hatebreed albums
Universal Records albums
Albums produced by Matt Hyde